Mor-Val Hosiery Mill, also known as Morris Mill, is a historic textile mill located at Denton, Davidson County, North Carolina. It was built in 1936, and is a one-story brick building consisting of a manufacturing area and office wing.  It has a low-pitched roof and oversized windows. The mill remained in operation until about 1965.

It was added to the National Register of Historic Places in 2001.

References

Textile mills in North Carolina
Industrial buildings and structures on the National Register of Historic Places in North Carolina
Industrial buildings completed in 1936
Buildings and structures in Davidson County, North Carolina
National Register of Historic Places in Davidson County, North Carolina